The Argentine Hydrographic Service (abbreviated SHN) is the branch of the Ministry of Defense responsible for providing hydrographic services.

Background
Created on January 1, 1879, as Oficina Central de Hidrografía by decree 11.289 of President Nicolás Avellaneda. It became the current SHN on 1972 by National Law 19.922. Since 2007, it became part of the Ministry of Defense.

The main mission of the SHN is to provide safe navigation on national waters. The service do so with the creation and maintenance of nautical charts, coastal marker buoys, and lighthouses.  In concordance to the International Maritime Organization regulations, the SHN is also the global  coordinator for the NAVAREA VI zone, which covers the South West Atlantic Ocean region being responsible for emitting alerts to ships at sea and coordinating search and rescue operations.

The national official time is also a responsibility of the SHN through the National Naval Observatory.

By means of Decree 788/2007 it was transferred from the Argentine Navy field to the Ministry of Defense one.

Fleet 
As of 2010 the following Navy ships are assigned to it:
 ARA Puerto Deseado (Q-20)
 ARA Comodoro Rivadavia (Q-11) 
 ARA Cormorán (Q-15)
 ARA Petrel (Q-16)

In February 2015 CONICET acquired  the RV Sonne.

References

 
 Decree 788/2007

National hydrographic offices
Naval units and formations of Argentina
Military units and formations established in 1879